The following highways are numbered 278:

Canada
Manitoba Provincial Road 278

Japan
 Japan National Route 278

United States
 Interstate 278
 U.S. Route 278
 Arkansas Highway 278 (former)
 Florida State Road 278 (former)
 Georgia State Route 278
 K-278 (Kansas highway)
Kentucky Route 278
 Maryland Route 278 (former)
 Minnesota State Highway 278 (former)
 Montana Secondary Highway 278
 New Mexico State Road 278
 Nevada State Route 278
 New York State Route 278
 Ohio State Route 278
 Pennsylvania Route 278 (former)
 Tennessee State Route 278
 Texas State Highway 278 (former)
 Texas State Highway Spur 278
 Farm to Market Road 278 (Texas)
 Utah State Route 278 (former)
 Virginia State Route 278
 Washington State Route 278